Agon Fatmir Muçolli (born 26 September 1998) is an Albanian professional footballer who plays as a left winger for OB.

Club career

Early career
Muçolli was born in Fredericia, Denmark to Albanian parents originally from Kosovar city Podujevo and was the first child and succeded 1 year later by his brother Arbnor which is also professional footballer. Both brothers were registered to local club Fredericia at age around 5, prompted by their mother, also to say that their father was a footballer with great technique abilities but unable to play in higher levels due to the Kosovo War.

International career
He was capped 9 times for each Denmark national under-16 and under-17 side and twice for under-19 between years 2013 and 2016.

Albania
In start of August Agon declared that he would switch to play either for Albania youth teams or Kosovo youths stating that it's about felings not strength and when both Albania national team and Denmark were fighting in UEFA Euro 2016 qualifying Group I for a place in the final stages, I stuck with Albania. In September 2017 the Albania national under-21 teams coach Alban Bushi confirmed that both Muçolli's brothers will join his national side, brokered by fellow U21 international Ylber Ramadani, a recent arrival in Vejle. He was invited along his brother Arbnor at Albania national under-20 team by coach Alban Bushi for a friendly match against Georgia on 14 November 2017, despite Arbnor had to withdraw due to an injury. He received Albanian citizenship on the day of the match to become eligible to play as "red and black". He debutted subsequently for Albania U20 starting against Georgia as his side lost 3–0, but however Bushi stated that was a test match to discover future components who can play for the upper under-21 side.

Career statistics

Club

References

1998 births
Living people
People from Fredericia
Danish people of Albanian descent
Danish men's footballers
Denmark youth international footballers
Vejle Boldklub players
FC Fredericia players
Kristiansund BK players
Odense Boldklub players
Danish expatriate men's footballers
Expatriate footballers in Norway
Danish expatriate sportspeople in Norway
Danish 1st Division players
Danish Superliga players
Eliteserien players
Association football midfielders
Sportspeople from the Region of Southern Denmark
Albanian footballers
Albania youth international footballers
Albanian expatriate footballers
Albanian expatriates in Denmark
Albanian expatriate sportspeople in Denmark
Expatriate footballers in Denmark